Dresher (previously Dreshertown) is a community in Upper Dublin Township, Montgomery County, Pennsylvania. The population was 5,610 at the 2000 census.  Because Dresher is neither an incorporated area nor a census-designated place, all statistics are for the ZIP Code 19025, with which the community is coterminous.

Geography
The headwaters for Sandy Run, a tributary of Wissahickon Creek are located in Dresher.

Dresher is located north of Philadelphia and is adjacent to the Pennsylvania Turnpike (Interstate 276).

Demographics
At the 2000 census, there were 5,610 people, 1,765 households, and 1,538 families in the community. The population density was 1,734.04/sq mi. There were 1,830 housing units at an average density of 564.67/sq mi. The racial make-up was 89.9% White, 1.0% African American, 0.7% Native American, 6.8% Asian, 0.0% Pacific Islander, 0.8% from other races, and 0.8% from two or more races. Hispanic or Latino of any race were 1.2% of the population.

Out of the 1,765 households, 47.6% had children under the age of 18 living with them, 80.4% were married couples living together, 2.3% had a female householder with no husband present, and 12.9% were non-families. 12.0% of households were made up of individuals. The average household size was 3.05 and the average family size was 3.31.

The age distribution was 30.1% under the age of 18, 4.8% from 18 to 24, 23.1% from 25 to 44, 30.7% from 45 to 64, and 11.3% 65 or older. The median age was 39.8 years. For every 100 females, there were 96 males. For every 100 females age 18 and over, there were 93 males.

The median household income was $99,231 and the median family income  was $107,236.  Males had a median income of $82,897 versus $35,316 for females. The per capita income for the community was $38,865. 2.1% of the population and 2.1% of families were below the poverty line.

Notable people
 Zach Pfeffer (born 1995), American soccer player
 Josh Shapiro (born 1973), Governor of Pennsylvania

Unincorporated communities in Montgomery County, Pennsylvania
Unincorporated communities in Pennsylvania
Upper Dublin Township, Montgomery County, Pennsylvania